Upper Hack Lift is a lift bridge carrying the New Jersey Transit Main Line across the Hackensack River at mile 6.9 between Secaucus, New Jersey and Lyndhurst.

History 

It was built by the Delaware, Lackawanna and Western Railroad in 1958 and completed in March 1959 to serve the Boonton Line and replaced an older swing span from 1901 on the site, which had been damaged by shifting currents. The new single-track lift bridge cost $5,500,000, financed through a five-year bank loan.

Following a 1963 route realignment, Erie Main Line service began using the bridge, with Erie Lackawanna, NJDOT and later NJ Transit Main Line commuter service continuing to use the route. It was repainted in 1994 to its current turquoise blue color.

Upper Hack is the only single-track lift bridge in New Jersey (excluding the Arthur Kill Vertical Lift Bridge connecting to Staten Island). It is visible to motorists on the New Jersey Turnpike's western spur between Interchanges 15W and 16W.

Remnants of the older swing span are visible just to the north of the current lift span, as concrete abutments and piers remain.

The current drawbridge schedule at Upper Hack (as stated by U.S. Coast Guard, 33 CFR 117.723) allows the bridge to open on signal unless the bridge tender is at the nearby HX Draw on the Bergen County Line upstream.

See also
 List of crossings of the Hackensack River
List of bridges, tunnels, and cuts in Hudson County, New Jersey
NJT movable bridges
Hackensack RiverWalk
Timeline of Jersey City area railroads

References

External links 
Movable Railroad Bridges of New Jersey-photo catalog
 Movable Railroad Bridges of New Jersey
Upper Hack Lift photo gallery
U.S. Government Printing Office: DRAWBRIDGE OPERATION REGULATIONS-Hackensack River (Code of Federal Regulations 33 CFR 117.723)
Erie Lift (Upper Hack) photos and notes

Vertical lift bridges in New Jersey
Railroad bridges in New Jersey
Bridges completed in 1959
Bridges over the Hackensack River
Delaware, Lackawanna and Western Railroad bridges
NJ Transit bridges
Secaucus, New Jersey
Lyndhurst, New Jersey
Bridges in Hudson County, New Jersey
Bridges in Bergen County, New Jersey
1959 establishments in New Jersey